Dehwari (Dehwārī) is a southwestern Persian language spoken by 19,000 Dehwar people in Balochistan, Pakistan as of 2018. Most of the Dehwari speakers are concentrated in Mastung, Khuzdar, Nushk, Kharan, Sarlath District, Dalbandin, and Kalat.

Influence on Brahui 
Dehwari was introduced to the Brahui in the seventeenth century and the modern-day language uses many Dehwari loanwords in its vocabulary.

Brahui influence 
In turn, Brahui has heavily influenced the language, which has made Dehwari a Persian dialect under heavy Brahui influence.  This has made Dehwari speakers bilingual in both Dehwari and Brahui, and some in Balochi, Urdu, and even English.

Drop in Speakers 
The drop of speakers in Dehwari was recorded in the 1921 Indian Census, with Pashto facing the same consequences in Kalat and Mastung.  And in the 1931 Indian Census, the Dehwari population outside of Kalat and Mastung was only 1,795.

References

Languages of Balochistan, Pakistan
Persian language
Persian language in Pakistan